= Broken as Things Are =

2004 novel by Martha Witt

- First edition
- Author: Martha Witt
- Cover artist: Emily Mahon
- Language: English
- Genre: Novel
- Publisher: Henry Holt and Co.
- Publication date: August 12, 2004
- Publication place: United States
- Media type: Print (hardback & paperback)
- Pages: 304 pp
- ISBN: 978-0-8050-7595-3

Broken as Things Are is a 2004 novel by Martha Witt. The book was released on August 12, 2004, through Henry Holt and Co. and follows the coming of age of a young Southern girl.

== Synopsis ==
Fourteen-year-old Morgan Lee has a strange, yet close, relationship with her brother Ginx. Ginx is exceedingly withdrawn and didn't speak fully until she was five, when he began spontaneously speaking in full sentences. The two grow close, with Ginx referring to himself in the plural for himself and Morgan, as well as the two developing their own language. The friendship isn't perfect, as Ginx will occasionally act badly towards Morgan, such as giving her concussions on occasion. However, when Morgan begins fall for her friend Billy, Ginx becomes unable to cope with this reality.

== Reception ==
Critical reception for Broken as Things Are has been mostly positive. Entertainment Weekly and Booklist both gave positive reviews for the novel, with Entertainment Weekly stating that although the opening of the book might make readers feel "stranded", the book improved as it went on.
